John Mario Gazzola (born 1957) is an Australian politician, and member of the South Australian Legislative Council for the Labor Party from 2002 to 2018. He was President of the Council from 2012 to 2014.

From 2003 to 2012, Gazzola was a member of the South Australian Parliament's Aboriginal Lands Parliamentary Standing Committee.

Previous to entering politics, Gazzola was secretary of the Australian Services Union (SA).

Gazzola announced in February 2017 that he would be retiring from parliament as of the 2018 election.

References

External links
 
 Parliamentary Profile: SA Labor website
 

1957 births
Living people
Members of the South Australian Legislative Council
Presidents of the South Australian Legislative Council
Australian Labor Party members of the Parliament of South Australia
Australian trade unionists
Australian politicians of Italian descent
Labor Left politicians
21st-century Australian politicians